Mahamahopadhyaya (Sanskrit: महामहोपाध्याय) is an honorific title given to prestigious scholars by the Government of India. Prior to 1947, the title was bestowed by the British Raj, and before them, by the kings of ancient India. In ancient India, a scholar that wrote works based on topics related to the shastras was granted the title Mahopadhyaya. The title Mahamahopadhyaya was bestowed on the best amongst the Mahopadhyaya scholars.

Some of the notable recipients are:

 Kaviraja Shyamaldas (1836-1893), one of the first modern Indian historian and author of Vir Vinod; Kaviraja and Dewan of Udaipur State
 Kaviraja Murardan (1830-1914), Diwan, Council Member, Judge of the Appellate Court, Officer of the Civil Court, General Superintendent, and the Magistrate of the princely state of Marwar
 Rewa Prasad Dwivedi (1935-2021), Sanskrit scholar based in Varanasi, originally from Nadner on the banks of Narmada river in Madhya Pradesh
 Haraprasad Shastri (1853–1931), Sanskrit scholar, archivist and historian of Bengali literature
 Peri Lakshmi Narayana Sastry (1875-1949)
 Pt. Sadashiva Jairam Dehadrai, Rao Bahadur (1861), Sanskrit scholar, Freedom Fighter and Professor of Sanskrit
 Pandurang Vaman Kane (1880–1963), Sanskrit scholar
 Jayamant Mishra (1925–2010), Sanskrit scholar
 Vedam Venkataraya Sastry (1853–1929), Sanskrit and Telugu poet, critic and dramatist
 Ram Avatar Sharma (1877–1929), Sanskrit scholar
 Datto Vaman Potdar (1890–1979), historian, writer, and orator
 Bishweshwar Nath Reu (1890–1966), historian, epigraphist, numismatist and Sanskritist
 Vasudev Vishnu Mirashi (1893–1985), Sanskrit scholar, in 1941
 Ramacharya Narsimhacharya Galagali (1892-1981), Sanskrit Scholar, Sanskrit Poet, Author of two incomplete Mahakavyam.
 Pathani Samanta (1835–1904), Sanskrit/Odia astronomer and scholar
 Jagannath Mishra (Puri, Odisha), Sanskrit scholar
 Hathibhai Shastri, Sanskrit scholar, writer, and orator. High priest of the Kingdom of Jamnagar.
 T. Ganapati Sastri, Received the Mahamahopadhyaya title in  1918
 U Ve Swaminatha Iyer (1855–1942), Tamil scholar
 Pandithamani Kathiresan Chettiar, (1881-1953), Tamil and Sanskrit scholar, translator
 Gopinath Kaviraj (1887 – 1976) in 1934, Sanskrit scholar,  philosopher, Padma Vibhushan (1964) 
 Acharya Gangaram Shastri (Bhopal, Madhya Pradesh and only one in history from the state to be conferred the honour), (1923 - 2014), Sanskrit and Hindi scholar
 Sri Dongare Veereswara Krishna Sastry, Sanskrit scholar
 Sri Remella SuryaPrakasa Sastry, Sanskrit scholar, Purva Mimamsa exponent from Rajahmundry Andhra Pradesh
 Sri Sannidhanam Lakshminarayana Murthy Sastry, Sanskrit Scholar, Purva Mimamsa exponent from Rajahmundry Andhra Pradesh
 Prof. Sri Pullela Sri Ramachandrudu, Sanskrit/Telugu Scholar, Director of Sanskrit Academy Osmania University, Hyderabad
 Sri Viswanatha Gopalakrishna Sastry, Sanskrit scholar, Nyaya exponent from Rajahmundry Andhra Pradesh
 Bhadreshdas Swami, Sanskrit scholar
 Yogacharya Dr Ashoke Kumar Chatterjee, World Kriyayoga Master, Conferred by Tirupati Sanskrit University with title  of Mahamahopadhyaya  on 6 March 2013, for His 6 decades of spiritual and literary contribution and inimitable contribution to Indology.
 Bidhushekhar Shastri (1878-1957) Sanskrit scholar and editor
B. N. Krishnamurti Sharma (1909 - 2005) renowned Indian Sanskrit scholar, professor, Indologist and Dvaita Vedanta expert
 A. N. Jani (1921–2003) Sanskrit scholar and Indologist
Dr. Mani Dravid Sastrigal Sanskrit scholar, professor and Advaita Vedanta, Nyaya, Mimamsa and Vyakarana  expert
 Shivji Upadhayaya  Sanskrit scholar and Maha-Mantri of Śrī Kāśī Vidvat Parisad.
Sri Viswanatha Gopalakrishna Sanskrit scholar and Advaita Vedanta, Nyaya and Mimamsa expert
 Shridharshatri Pathak
 VasudevShatri Abhyankar
 Kashinathshatrai Abhyankar
 Mahamahopadhyaya Shri Vashishta Tripathi Sanskrit scholar, Nyaya expert and President of Śrī Kāśī Vidvat Parisad.

References 

Indian awards
Indian scholars
Titles in India